The Dongsi Mosque is a mosque in Dongsi Subdistrict, Dongcheng District, Beijing, China.

History
According to local legends, the mosque was built during the Liao dynasty when Beijing was one of the secondary capitals of the Liao. However, records suggest that the mosque was constructed in 1346 during the Yuan dynasty. The mosque underwent expansion and renovation in 1447 and again in 1486. The earlier repairs were financed by Chen Yuyuan, a prominent officer during the Ming dynasty. The mosque survived a fire in the late 19th century but suffered damage. Comprehensive repairs were done to the mosque throughout the 20th century.

Architecture
The mosque consists of two gates, a minaret, a prayer hall and a library. The prayer hall has Koran carved on the arches of the hall and can accommodate up to 500 worshipers. On the southern part of the courtyard there are five wing halls and on the northern part there are three wing halls. The architectural style of the mosque has features of Ming Dynasty. Located on the southern part of the courtyard, the library has various version of the Koran.

Transportation
The mosque is accessible within walking distance south of Dongsi Station of Beijing Subway.

See also
 Islam in China
 List of mosques in China

References

Mosques in Beijing